Andrew Chalmers may refer to:

 Andrew Chalmers (actor) (born 1992), Canadian actor
 Andrew Chalmers (footballer) (born 1899), Scottish professional footballer
Andrew Chalmers (rugby league) New Zealand businessman rugby league player